"C.O.U.N.T.R.Y." may refer to:

 "C.O.U.N.T.R.Y.", a song on American country music duo LoCash Cowboy's eponymous 2012 album
 "C.O.U.N.T.R.Y.", a song on American country music singer Tyler Farr's 2015 album Suffer in Peace
 "C-O-U-N-T-R-Y", a single from American country music singer Joe Diffie's 1995 album Life's So Funny

See also
 Country
 Country (disambiguation)
 Country music